SMS Monarch  ("His Majesty's Ship Monarch") was the lead ship of the  built for the Austro-Hungarian Navy in the 1890s. After their commissioning, Monarch and the two other Monarch-class ships made several training cruises in the Mediterranean Sea in the early 1900s. Monarch and her sisters formed the 1st Capital Ship Division of the Austro-Hungarian Navy until they were replaced by the newly commissioned  pre-dreadnought battleships at the turn of the century. In 1906 the three Monarchs were placed in reserve and only recommissioned during the annual summer training exercises. After the start of World War I, Budapest was recommissioned and assigned to 5th Division together with her sisters.

The division was sent to Cattaro in August 1914 to attack Montenegrin and French artillery that was bombarding the port, and Monarch remained there for the rest of the war. The ship was decommissioned in early 1918 and became an accommodation ship. She was awarded to Great Britain by the Paris Peace Conference in 1920. The British sold her for scrap and she was broken up in Italy beginning in 1921.

Description and construction

At only  maximum displacement, the Monarch class was less than half the size of the battleships of other major navies at the time, and were officially designated as coast defense ships. Austria-Hungary's only coastline was on the Adriatic Sea, and the Austro-Hungarian government believed that the role of its navy was solely to defend the nation's coast.

Her two 4-cylinder vertical triple-expansion steam engines produced a total of  using steam from five cylindrical boilers. She was manned by 26 officers and 397 enlisted men, a total of 423 personnel.

The armament of the Monarch class consisted of four  Krupp K/94 guns mounted in two twin-gun turrets, one fore and one aft of the superstructure. The ships carried 80 rounds for each gun. Their secondary armament was six  Škoda guns located in casemates in the superstructure. Ten quick-firing (QF)  Škoda guns and four 47-millimeter QF Hotchkiss guns provided defense against torpedo boats. The ships also mounted two  torpedo tubes, one on each broadside. Each torpedo tube was provided with two torpedoes. In 1917 a  G. L/45 anti-aircraft gun was installed.

The Monarch-class ships were ordered in May 1892, with Monarch to be built at the Pola Naval Arsenal (Seearsenal). The ship was laid down on 31 July 1893, and she was launched on 9 May 1895 by Archduchess Maria Theresa, wife of Archduke Karl Ludwig. She was commissioned on 11 May 1898.

Service history
Monarch and her sisters formed the Navy's 1st Capital Ship Division (I. Schwere Division) in 1899, and the division made a training cruise to the Eastern Mediterranean where they made port visits in Greece, Lebanon, Turkey and Malta later that year. In early 1902, they made another training cruise to the Western Mediterranean with port visits in Algeria, Spain, France, Italy, Corfu, and Albania. The ship was fitted with a Siemens-Braun radio early the following year. The ships of the division were inspected by Archduke Franz Ferdinand, the heir to the throne, in March 1903 at Gravosa. In 1904, the Monarch-class ships formed the 2nd Capital Ship Division, and they took part in the 1904 cruise of the Adriatic and Mediterranean Seas as well as training exercises in which the three s engaged the Budapest and her sisters in simulated combat. Those maneuvers marked the first time two homogeneous squadrons consisting of modern battleships operated in the Austro-Hungarian Navy.

The Monarchs were relegated to the newly formed Reserve Squadron on 1 January 1906, and were only recommissioned for the annual summer exercises. They participated in a fleet review by Archduke Franz Ferdinand, conducted in the Koločepski Channel near Šipan, in September. The ships were briefly recommissioned at the beginning of 1913, as the 4th Division after the start of the Second Balkan War, but were decommissioned again on 10 March. In early 1914, Monarch made a cruise in the Levant with the dreadnoughts ,  and the predreadnought . Two of the ship's crew came down with smallpox and cerebrospinal meningitis in Egypt and caused the ship to be quarantined for several weeks in Pola.

World War I

With the beginning of World War I the three Monarchs were recommissioned as the 5th Division. They were sent down to the Bay of Kotor in August 1914, to attack Montenegrin artillery batteries on Mount Lovćen bombarding the Austro-Hungarian naval base at Cattaro and the fortifications defending it. Monarch and her sisters arrived on 13 August, but their guns could not elevate enough to engage all of the enemy artillery, which was reinforced by eight French guns on 19 October. The battleship  was summoned to deal with the guns two days later, and she managed to knock out several French guns and forced the others to withdraw by 27 October.

Monarch remained at Cattaro for the rest of the war to deter any further attacks. The ship's crew joined in the Cattaro Mutiny in early February 1918. Six weeks later she became an accommodation ship for the submarine crews based at nearby Gjenovic. Monarch was handed over to Great Britain as war reparations in January 1920 and broken up for scrap in Italy in 1921.

Notes

Explanatory notes

Citations

References

Further reading

External links

 The Monarch Class (1895/1898)
 Monarch Class Battleships

Monarch-class coastal defense ships
1895 ships